The Challenge: Rivals is the 21st season of the MTV reality game show, The Challenge. Rivals takes place in Costa Rica, Argentina, and Patagonia. The season used former cast members from The Real World and The Challenge. Rivals marked the first season of The Challenge not to include any cast members from Road Rules. 

The season featured a format in which players were teamed with their arch enemies from past seasons of The Real World and The Challenge. The season premiered on June 22, 2011, and concluded with the "S#!% They Should Have Shown" special on September 7, 2011.

This is the first edition of the Rivals series, with Rivals II and Rivals III following in 2013 and 2016, respectively.

Contestants

Teams

Format
This season of The Challenge featured a brand new format, consisting of 14 same-gender teams — seven male and seven female. Each team will consist of players who will be paired with their "worst enemies," whom they have engaged in bitter feuds, fights and rivalries with in previous Real World and/or Challenge seasons.  This format was inspired by ESPN columnist Bill Simmons in a mailbag by someone known as "B.J. from Brooklyn (where it was dubbed “Mortal Enemies” but maintained the premise) Simmons and Dave Jacoby further discussed this idea on the B.S. Report, Simmons' podcast.

Each team participates in numerous challenges (sometimes called "missions"), which are followed by an elimination round called "The Jungle." Each challenge is alternatively designated as either a male or a female challenge day. The winning team of the gender not designated for the Jungle is awarded $2,000. The winning team whose gender is designated for elimination wins immunity from the Jungle, while the team that finishes last is automatically sent to the Jungle. An open deliberation and vote then held among the players to determine which team of the same gender will face the last-place finisher in the Jungle. The team who wins the elimination round returns to the game and has a shot at a $300,000 prize, while the losing team is eliminated from the game.

At the end of the season, six teams will compete in the final challenge — three of each gender. The first-place male and female teams win $100,000 apiece, second-place wins $50,000 and the third-place finishers go home empty-handed.

Pre-season rivalry backgrounds
Rivals combines individuals who have had acrimonious or at least strained relations or interactions prior to the season. The following lists all the teams on Rivals, and explains why they've been paired and dubbed as "rivals." Each of the teams' history of animosity and/or open expressions of hostility are detailed.

Male teams
 Adam K. & CT: The bad blood between the two dates back to their original season together on The Real World: Paris, with CT becoming confrontational toward Adam numerous times. During the most infamous occasion, CT pushed Adam around in the Parisian streets, telling him "don't pretend like you got my back dog...I'll fucking work you." On The Gauntlet III, Adam believed that CT's playful nature with Rookie Frank Roessler was getting out of hand and tried to break it up. This led to CT telling Adam he was doing the same thing he did in Paris, and poured a beer on his head. The years of tension between the two finally came to a head on The Duel II, when they engaged in an ugly brawl that got them both removed from the show before any challenges took place.
 Adam R. & Leroy: The tension between Adam & Leroy developed during their original season on The Real World: Las Vegas, when Leroy became disgusted by Adam's obnoxious behavior within their Hard Rock Hotel and Casino suite and the accompanying Vanity nightclub. Adam became even more disorderly when he got drunk, and Leroy made his feelings clear to the rest of the roommates, with Adam taking great offense to that.
 Leroy & Michael:  Leroy and Michael were not considered rivals as they formed a pretty strong friendship on their season of The Real World: Las Vegas - their partnership simply resulted from Michael replacing Adam R. in Episode 1.
 Brandon & Ty: The two engaged in a heated squabble during Cutthroat and they later faced off in a grueling Gulag, in which Brandon won by default after an exhausted Ty failed to get up.
 Davis & Tyrie: During their original season of The Real World: Denver, the two engaged in a very heated verbal scuffle, which included Davis drunkenly using a racial epithet toward Tyrie and producers having to separate the two in order to keep the fight from escalating. The two won the Best Fight award at the Real World Awards Bash in 2008.
 Evan & Nehemiah: The animosity between the two began on The Duel II, after Nehemiah stated that he does not like how Evan plays the game. Nehemiah made his distaste towards Evan known to fellow cast member Brad Fiorenza after his friend Davis Mallory was eliminated by Evan. Nehemiah then called out Evan for a Duel in the following episode, which an enraged Evan subsequently won, sending Nehemiah home.
 Johnny & Tyler: Their feud dates back to the first episode of The Duel, after Tyler called out his own Real World: Key West roommate Johnny to the first male Duel, feeling that Johnny was the weakest player. After Johnny told Tyler to lift 31 watermelons, Tyler easily sent him home. Johnny would then exact revenge during The Gauntlet III by calling out Tyler for a Gauntlet; following this decision, Tyler proceeded to yell at Johnny and argue with fellow Key West/Gauntlet III housemate Janelle Casanave. Tyler was subsequently eliminated, much to both Johnny's and Janelle's delight. The two were set to face against each other in a Gulag elimination during Cutthroat, but were met with a shocking twist to the game in which Johnny was eliminated by CT instead. On the Cutthroat reunion, when asked if CT was not involved, Johnny emphatically denied that the results would have been the same, to which Tyler immediately became angry and said if he could hold CT off for 40 minutes, he could have easily tossed Johnny around.
 Kenny & Wes: The two were friends on the Fresh Meat and Duel challenges. The conflict between the two had been initially spearheaded in The Island, after Kenny became involved in a relationship with Johanna Botta, who was not only Wes' roommate in The Real World: Austin and romantic interest, but was someone whom Wes wanted to even marry at one point. Their rivalry culminated in The Ruins, when the two became teammates on the Champions team. Wes admitted that the "love pentagon" situation was one of the main reasons he came out of Challenge retirement. Kenny, along with his partners in crime Evan and Johnny, did everything in his power to remove Wes from the team, which he ultimately did after sending Wes into The Ruins three times. Their hatred re-kindled during the next challenge they appeared on, (Fresh Meat II), and although they appeared to extinguish their animosity toward each other during The Ruins reunion, which was filmed after the filming of Fresh Meat II, it returned during the Fresh Meat II reunion, which was filmed after both seasons had aired and all had the opportunity to view what transpired. Their rivalry was the driving force behind almost all of the season's drama.

Female teams
 Aneesa & Robin: During The Duel, a drunk Robin made several offensive remarks regarding Aneesa's sexual orientation, race and origins, which drew Aneesa's wrath. Aneesa stated that this was not the first time Robin had made remarks about Aneesa's life, and Aneesa later chose Robin to go into the Duel subsequently after and sent Robin home.
 Camila & Theresa: Camila was excoriated by Theresa in Cutthroat, after Theresa claimed that Camila had stole Ty's sweatpants and Jenn's hat, causing Camila to break down while Theresa's drunk teammate Katie Doyle laughed in her face.
 Cara Maria & Laurel: Tension between the two began on Cutthroat, when Laurel accused Cara Maria of not being a worthy team member. Laurel continued to harbor hatred towards her, stating that she did not want to share any prize money with her and insinuated that Cara Maria got a "free ride" to the end because she had been romantically involved with Abram, their team's appointed leader.
 Evelyn & Paula: Tension between the two occurred on The Island challenge, when Evelyn was constantly ridiculed by Paula's alliance members, Johnny and Kenny. Paula was then double crossed by Evelyn after she won the final face-off and made a deal with Johnny and Kenny that she would not take their keys (and consequently eliminate them from the game) in a bid to join their boat and win the final challenge. In turn, Paula was then shafted by her own friends and left behind by the group, who would go on to win the final challenge without her. Evelyn and Paula next met up on Fresh Meat II, where Evelyn was a replacement cast member for Jonna Mannion who was unable to make it into British Columbia. Upon entering the house Paula expressed that she did not want Evelyn there, as she is a top competitor, and reluctantly gave Evelyn a hug to say hello. The two girls then became the right hand women to the two house alliance leaders, Kenny and Wes. The two would again face each other in an Exile elimination which would tip the balance of power in the house based on the outcome, in the end Evelyn was again victorious and Paula was visibly crushed after she and her partner (Jeff Barr) were eliminated by a narrow margin.
 Jasmine & Jonna: The two were involved in an awkward love triangle during their original season of The Real World: Cancun, when Jonna cheated on her boyfriend from home and became close to Jasmine's love interest, drawing jealousy from Jasmine.
 Jenn & Mandi: The two were involved in a heated scuffle during Fresh Meat II, after Mandi questioned Jenn's voting strategy. The two women got into a huge argument which led to Mandi calling Jenn a "dumb bitch." Jenn reacted by shoving Mandi off a table, throwing a drink at her, and almost punching her, only to have a barrage of insults follow the attack. Producers gave Mandi the option of sending Jenn home, but Mandi allowed Jenn to remain in the game.
 Katelynn & Sarah: The two were friends during their original season of The Real World: Brooklyn, but their friendship soured during Fresh Meat II, when Katelynn voted Sarah (and her partner, Vinny Foti) for the Exile, after Katelynn vowed not to vote her in. Sarah confronted Katelynn over this and revealed that her own mother warned her not to trust Katelynn. Sarah and Vinny would then be eliminated in the Exile by Kenny and his partner, Laurel.

Gameplay

Challenge games
 High Dive: Players run and jump off a platform that is suspended 150 feet above a waterfall. Players have to hold their partner's hands, then run together, and jump off the platform before a white line and clear as many hash marks as possible. A team is disqualified is one or both players step on the white line that is located inches from the end of the platform. The team that clears the most hash marks in the shortest amount of time wins.
 Winners: Adam R. & Leroy and Jasmine & Jonna
 Car Crusher: Teams smash cars using a Caterpillar, and have to flatten a car to where the team can push the car with the bucket to their goal. One player has to sit on their partner's lap to steer, while the other operates the heavy machinery. A team is disqualified if they pick up their car with the bucket, maneuver outside of the course boundary or knock over the crossbar at their goal with the bucket or any piece of a smashed car. The team that slides their smashed car through their goal in the fastest time without disqualifying wins.
 Winners: Adam K. & CT and Evelyn & Paula
 Sync or Swim: Teams start inside of a large container filled with 1,000 pounds of sand that is hanging from a platform. When players from each team begin shoveling out the sand, their container rises to a platform, where each player then has to jump to a zip line and ride it to the water, where the team that swims fastest to the finish line wins. A team is disqualified is any player pulls the zip line toward them at the top of the platform instead of jumping from the platform toward the zip line.
 Winners: Adam K. & CT and Evelyn & Paula
 Hammock Crawl: Teams have to move from one end of a platform to the other within a 15-minute time limit, only using hammocks that are hanging from the bottom of the platform. Teams are only allowed to touch two hammocks at any time, and must be in the same hammock before advancing to the next hammock. A team is disqualified if more than two hammocks are being touched at any time, or if one or both partners falls into the water. The team that makes it from one end of the platform to the other in the fastest time without disqualifying wins.
 Winners: Johnny & Tyler
 Against the Current: Teams have to paddle upstream in a kayak until the current pushes them out of the zone, after which teams have to paddle the opposite direction to the finish line. If one player falls out of a kayak, that team has 30 seconds to push the kayak past the finish line in order to avoid disqualification. The team with the lowest time differential of paddling upstream and subsequent paddling in the reverse direction to the finish line wins.
 Winners: Johnny & Tyler and Jenn & Mandi
 Catch & Release: One player from each team is suspended 30 feet above water, while the other partner has to run and jump on a platform toward their partner, and have their momentum carried them (via a zip line) toward the water. Once a team has determined that they have gone far enough, they can hit their release harness, which drops them into the water. The teams then have to swim toward a red buoy, which indicates the finish line.
 Winners: Cara Maria & Laurel and Kenny & Wes
 Sawed Off: One player from each team is hanging from ropes, from a platform 30 feet above water. Their partners have to use a high-powered fire hose to spray at the ropes, and with the force of the water, push the ropes toward an arrowhead blade until each rope slices on the blades, dropping their teammates into the water. A team is disqualified if their partner doesn't drop into the water within 20 minutes. The team with the fastest time wins, as well as automatic bid to the final challenge for the girls.
 Winners: Evelyn & Paula and Johnny & Tyler
 Bombs Away: One player is strapped to the bottom of a helicopter, while their teammate has to climb up a 20-foot rope and pull a rip cord, which will release that player into the water. Once the player climbing up a rope drops their teammate into the water, that player has launch into the water, which will stop the team time, in which the fastest time will determine the winner, as well as an automatic bid in the finals for the guys. A team is disqualified if the player climbing up the rope drops into the water before their opponent.
 Winners: Evelyn & Paula and Leroy & Michael

Jungle games
Hands On: Each player starts on a platform, leaning into their own partner. When T. J. Lavin pulls a lever, the platforms will slowly separate until it becomes difficult to keep balance. The team that falls into a mud pit first loses.
Played by: Evelyn & Paula vs. Aneesa & Robin
Blast Off: Players are attached to their partners, matched up two-on-two in football helmets and shoulder pads against their opponents in a circle, and have to tackle their opponent out of the circle. The first team to tackle their opponent out of the circle three times wins.
Played by: Davis & Tyrie vs. Kenny & Wes and Cara Maria & Laurel vs. Jasmine & Jonna
Door Jam: A wall is placed in between two teams. The wall has many doors that rotate to either side. Once the door is rotated to the "Rivals" logo, the door is claimed by that team at the end of the challenge. However, each team has the chance to turn the logo back to their side. The team with more doors with the "Rivals" logo facing them after five minutes wins.
Played by: Camila & Theresa vs. Cara Maria & Laurel
Going Up: Each player runs and jumps into a water pit, and has to climb up their assigned rope to the top to ring a bell. If a tie occurs with one player from each team winning, then those two players will face off in a one-on-one elimination, with the player who makes it to the top first winning the Jungle for their team.
Played by: Brandon & Ty vs. Kenny & Wes
Unburied: One player is taken away ahead of time and locked in a coffin, buried under a pile of hay. The other partner must dig through the hay to find their partner, but they don't know which pile contains their partner. After they successfully get their partner out, they must solve a complicated brain-teaser puzzle. The first team to solve the puzzle will win the Jungle.
Played by: Jasmine & Jonna vs. Katelynn & Sarah
Rail Slide: Players are hanging from a pipe 25 feet above the ground, and have to slide their pipe together from one side of an obstacle course to the other. The first team to slide their pipe to the end of the obstacle course wins.
Played by: Adam K. & CT vs. Evan & Nehemiah
T-Bone: Players run up and down, through intersecting half-pipes, and have to transfer colored balls to their partner's ball rack. The first team to transfer five balls to their partner's ball rack wins.
Played by: Adam K. & CT vs. Johnny & Tyler

Final challenge
The first part of the final challenge begins with each team being dragged 200 yards by a rope under water, from a boat, and once each team releases themselves from the boat, they have to swim to their designated kayaks, and paddle their way three miles to the end of the river. Once each team has changed into their team uniforms, they arrive at their first checkpoint, "Pet Rock," in they have to carry a heavy rock and chain. Once teams arrive at a "Memories" campsite, they have to memorize the details and placement of each item present at the example campsite for a later checkpoint. After studying the details of the campsite, each team advances to a "Pile Up" checkpoint, which involves shoveling mounds of dirt into a wheelbarrow, and transferring the dirt into their designated dumpzone. Teams cannot advance until their designated dumpzone is completely filled with dirt. Each team then arrives at a "Re-creation Campsite," in which each team has to memorize the details from the earlier example campsite. If a team copies each detail of the aforementioned campsite correctly, they can advance to the next checkpoint, if not, they have to return to the original example campsite. The next checkpoint is "Final Feast," in which each team has to eat every item on their plate, but results in each player vomiting. After the Final Feast, each team hikes up a mountain before sunset, and at nightfall, arrives at a "Sleep or Stand" checkpoint, in which one player can sleep while their partner has to balance on a rock. If a player falls off the rock, they have to wake their sleeping partner and trade places with their partner. The second part of the final challenge begins in the morning, with each team racing to the top of a mountain. The order of the teams starting up the mountain is determined by each teams' arrival at the "Stand or Sleep" checkpoint—first place gets a two-minute head-start, while second place gets a one-minute head-start. Each team hikes to the top of a mountain, and has to go on a search & rescue, using avalanche beacons which are programmed to locate the keys needed to unlock the trophies at the finish line.
 The Challenge: Rivals Winners: Evelyn & Paula & Johnny & Tyler
 Second-Place: Cara Maria & Laurel & Kenny & Wes
 Disqualified: Jenn & Mandi & Leroy & Michael

Game summary

Elimination chart

Jungle progress

Competition
 The team won the competition
 The team did not win the final challenge
 The team could not complete the final challenge and was disqualified
 The team won the mission, and was safe from the Jungle
 The team won the mission and $2,000
 The team was not selected for the Jungle
 The team won in the Jungle
 The team lost in the Jungle and was eliminated
 The team won the mission and $2,000, one team member was later disqualified from the competition, and his/her partner later received a replacement teammate

Team selections

Episodes

Reunion special
The Challenge: Rivals Reunion was aired on August 31, 2011, and was hosted by Maria Menounos. The cast members who attended the reunion were: Evelyn, Paula, Jenn, Mandi, Laurel, Cara Maria, Leroy, Mike, Tyler, Johnny Bananas, Wes, Kenny, Adam and CT.

Notes

References

External links
 

Rivals
2011 American television seasons
Television shows filmed in Costa Rica
Television shows filmed in Argentina